Melanconiella is a genus of fungi that belong to the Melanconidaceae family.

References 

Melanconidaceae
Sordariomycetes genera